These are lists of notable surgeons.

Pioneers and firsts to perform particular procedures 
Silvano Raia - Raia was the first surgeon to achieve a successful living donor liver transplantation in July 1989
B. K. Misra -  First neurosurgeon in the world to perform image-guided surgery for aneurysms, first in South Asia to perform stereotactic radiosurgery, first in India to perform awake craniotomy and laparoscopic spine surgery.
 Claudius Amyand, performed the first Appendicectomy
 Christiaan Barnard, cardiac surgery, first heart transplantation
 William DeVries, first permanent artificial heart transplant 
Eric Mühe, first laparoscopic cholecystectomy
 Paul Randall Harrington, first interior fixation of the spine by means of a Harrington rod.
 John Heysham Gibbon (1903–1973), first open heart surgery
 Simon Hullihen, The Father of Oral Surgery
 John Hunter, first aneurysm operation and founder of early schools of anatomy
 Leonard B. Kaban, Walter C. Guralnick Professor and Chair of the Department of Oral and Maxillofacial Surgery at the Massachusetts General Hospital/Harvard University, pioneer in oral, maxillofacial and craniofacial surgery
 Richard Lehman (surgeon), pioneered several orthopedic surgeries
 Paolo Macchiarini, first stem cell grown trachea transplant.
 Frederic E. Mohs, developed the Mohs Micrographic Surgery technique (MMS) aka Mohs surgery in 1938 to remove skin cancer lesions.
 Dallas B. Phemister, developed the Phemister graft and early innovator in orthopedics
 Theodore H. Schwartz, first center in New York City to use intraoperative MRI scanning during endoscopic pituitary surgery
 Lall Sawh, C.M.T., F.R.C.S.(Edin.). Kidney transplantation pioneer in the Caribbean and Latin America. Early proponent of Viagra.
 Michael Woodruff, transplantation pioneer.
 Sergelen Orgoi, developed low cost liver transplantation for developing countries

Researchers and inventors in the field of surgery 

Norman Bethune, Canadian thoracic surgeon and humanitarian, early proponent of universal health care and inventor of the first practical mobile blood transport unit.
 Victor Chang
 Svyatoslav Fyodorov (1927–2000), creator of radial keratotomy
John Heysham Gibbon, invented the heart-lung machine.
 Henry Gray, author of Gray's Anatomy 
Moshe Gueron, best known for his pioneering research about human heart influences in result of scorpion sting. 
 Gavril Ilizarov, Russian orthopedic surgeon who invented the procedure to lengthen or reshape limb bones.
 Walter Lawrence, Jr., surgical oncologist and leader in civil rights health equity efforts
 Lars Leksell, neurosurgery, inventor of radiosurgery
 Joseph Lister, discoverer of surgical asepsis
 Kakish Ryskulova, inventor of new techniques in vascular surgery
Hilda Villegas Castrejón, Mexican surgeon and pioneer in electron microscopy
Vivien Thomas, developer with Alfred Blalock and Helen B. Taussig of the first congenital heart surgery techniques

See also 
 History of surgery
 Surgery
Women in medicine

References

External links
History of Surgeons on surgeons.org.uk
Famous Surgeons on mcqsurgery.com